The NCAA Division III baseball tournament is an annual college baseball tournament held at the culmination of the spring regular season to determine the NCAA Division III baseball champion. The tournament has been played since 1976, soon after the formation of Division III. Most of the 56 teams who qualify do so by winning an automatic bid that comes along with their conference's championship; others receive at-large bids. The initial round consists of six- and eight-team regionals held at pre-selected sites in eight regions: New England, New York, Mid-Atlantic, South, Mideast, Midwest, Central, and West. The eight regional champions advance to the final round of the Division III Baseball Championship tournament, which is hosted at Veterans Memorial Stadium in Cedar Rapids, Iowa in 2019 and 2021. The event was formerly held at Fox Cities Stadium in Grand Chute, Wisconsin, just outside of Appleton until 2018.

In both the regional and final rounds, the tournament uses a "double elimination" format, in which teams must lose twice to be eliminated.

Marietta are the most successful program, with six national titles.

Eastern Connecticut State are the reigning national champions, winning their fifth championship in 2022.

Results

Champions

 Schools highlighted in pink are closed or no longer sponsor athletics.
 Schools highlighted in yellow have reclassified athletics from NCAA Division III.

See also

 NCAA Division I Baseball Championship
 NCAA Division II Baseball Championship
 NAIA World Series
 List of college baseball awards
 National Club Baseball Association
 Pre-NCAA baseball champion
 U.S. college baseball awards

References

External links
 NCAA baseball
 College Baseball Daily
 Award winners (Archived) (~2021)
 Records (Archived) (~2021)